55:15 Never Too Late is a 2021 Thai streaming series starring Korapat Kirdpan (Nanon), Kanyarat Ruangrung (Piploy), Thanawat Ratanakitpaisan (Khaotung), Kay Lertsittichai, Benyapa Jeenprasom (View), Wasu Saengsingkaeo (Jeep), Sinjai Plengpanich (Nok), Songsit Rungnopakunsi (Kob), Amarin Nitibhon and Kara Polasit.

Directed by Saranyu Jiralaksanakul, produced by Thai company GMMTV and distributed exclusively by Disney+ Hotstar for the first time, this series is one of the sixteen television series of the aforementioned production company for 2021 during their "GMMTV 2021: The New Decade Begins" event on 3 December 2020. The series premiered on Hotstar on 6 December 2021 meanwhile, it will premiered on GMM 25 on 5 January 2022 airing every Wednesdays and Thursdays at 20:30 ICT (8:30 pm) replacing Baker Boys' timeslot on GMM25. The official trailer of the series was released on 25 November 2021 by GMMTV, along with its official main casts and characters.

Synopsis 
'55:15 Never Too Late' follows 5 characters, aged 55, who one day woke up and was their 15 year old selves.  San,  a professional voice actor; Jaya, a popular singer who gained popularity during the 1980s; Paul, owner of a bar; Amonthep a former boxer who now owns a boxing ring center, and Jarunee, a high school teacher. The five characters have a second chance to pursue their dreams, aspirations and more, by redoing their lives at the age of 15.

Will the five figure out what turned them back to 15 years old? and will they change back to 55?

Casts and characters

Main 
Korapat Kirdpan (Nanon) as San (aged 15 years old)
Vasu Sangsingkeo (Jeep) as San (aged 55 years old)
Kanyarat Ruangrung (Piploy) as Jaya (aged 15 years old)
Sinjai Plengpanich (Nok) as Jaya (aged 55 years old)
Thanawat Ratanakitpaisan (Khaotung) as Songpol (aged 15 years old)
Songsit Roongnophakunsri (Kob) as Songpol (aged 55 years old)
Kay Lertsittichai as Amornthep (aged 15 years old)
Amarin Nitibhon as Amornthep (aged 55 years old)
Benyapa Jeenprasom (View) as Jarunee (aged 15 years old)
Kara Polasit as Jarunee (aged 55 years old)

Supporting 
Grace Mahadumrongkul as Prim (aged 55 years old)
Krissana Sreadthatamrong (Tu)
Anusorn Maneeted (Yong) as Mathee
Luckana Siriwong (Bim)
Anuwan Jiranantawat
Michael Shaowanasai
Pahun Jiyacharoen (Marc)
Weerayut Chansook (Arm) as Bomb
Tawinan Anukoolprasert (Sea) as Pangpond
Pawin Kulkaranyawich (Win) as Pipu
Sureeyares Yakares (Pringkhing) as Noinae
Preeyaphat Lawsuwansiri (Earn) as Joom 
Natthisarat Phongphanumaspaisarn (Mind)
Napasorn Weerayuttvilai (Puimek) as Prim (aged 15 years old)
Praekwan Phongskul (Bimbeam) as Kiki
Natthachai Sirinanthachot (Birth)

Guest
 Sahaphap Wongratch (Mix) as Himself
 Pirapat Watthanasetsiri (Earth) as Himself

Soundtracks

Reception

Thailand television ratings 
In the table below,  represents the lowest ratings and  represents the highest ratings.

 Based on the average audience share per episode.

References

External links 
 55:15 Never Too Late on Disney+ Hotstar
 
 GMMTV

2021 Thai television series debuts
Disney+ Hotstar original programming
Television series by GMMTV
Thai drama television series